Manki  (Urdu: مانکی is a town and Union Council of Nowshera District in Khyber Pakhtunkhwa, Pakistan. It is located to the south of Swabi City in Swabi.

Overview 
Manki is also the home of one of the most powerful families in Pakistan. The Khattak family of Manki village includes Nasrullah Khan Khattak ex-Chief Minister, Khyber Pakhtunkhwa. The Khattak family is responsible for building most of the large dams and link canals in Pakistan, including Khanpur Dam, Simly Dam, and Rawal Dam and many other large construction projects. 
 
Manki Sharif has the most talented and educated people that are serving in different important institutions in Pakistan. Highly Commissioned officers in Civil & Army, Serving doctors, engineers, Accountants, CEO's. The culture is rich bounded with strong ethics of the community. However, majority of the people are self-employed running their own construction businesses. It is estimated that 85% have their own businesses. According to history, the forefathers moved into the area where the village is located in 1857. 

Manki Shareef is the birthplace of former chief ministers of Khyber Pakhtunkhwa, Nasrullah Khan Khattak and Parvaiz Khattak.

According to the 2017 census, the population of Manki Sharif, is 21,785.

See also 

 Nowshera District
 Khyber Pakhtunkhwa

References

Populated places in Nowshera District